The following list includes notable people who were born in or have lived in La Crosse, Wisconsin.

Academics 

Donald J. Berthrong, historian
Ruth Boynton, physician and educator
Robert M. Dammon, professor and academic administrator
David Garbers, scientist
Adolph Gundersen, physician
Edward R. Hauser, animal scientist
William Duncan MacMillan, mathematician and astronomer
Curt Michel, NASA astronaut, professor
Louis Hermann Pammel, botanist
Walter Ristow, librarian
John O. Schwenn, psychologist and academic administrator
William A. Thompson, engineer
Blanche Wilkins Williams, educator of deaf students

Activists and journalists 

 Brynild Anundsen, Norwegian-American journalist
 Harriet Bossnot, social and civic worker
 Chris Bury, Nightline correspondent
 James Cameron, civil rights activist
 Tom Hanneman, sports broadcaster
 Mark Kellogg, reporter (killed at the Battle of the Little Bighorn)
 Frieda S. Miller, labor and women's rights activist
 William Mullen, journalist
 Charles M. Palmer, organizer of the Associated Press
 Marcus M. Pomeroy, editor of the La Crosse Democrat newspaper during the Civil War
 George Edwin Taylor, activist and journalist
 Dave Umhoefer, Pulitzer Prize-winning journalist

Artists and performers 

Erik Call, cinematographer
Bernard Joseph Dockendorff, architect
Chip Dunham, cartoonist
Mattie Gunterman, photographer
Frederick Heath, architect
Joseph Losey, film and theater director
Christy Oates, woodworker and furniture designer
Elmer Petersen, sculptor
Nicholas Ray, film and theater director
John W. Ross, architect

Actors 

 Lottie Alter, actor
Val Bettin, actor
Alexa Demara, model and actor
Charles Dierkop, actor
Brandon Ratcliff, actor
Ford Sterling, actor

Authors 

 Ole Amundsen Buslett, author
 Sylvester John Hemleben, poet, writer, and academic
Karla Huston, poet
Peg Kehret, author
E. E. Knight, author
Helen Adelia Manville, poet and litterateur
Marion Manville Pope, poet and author
William Stobb, poet
John Toland, Pulitzer Prize-winning author and historian
Danielle Trussoni, author

Musicians 

 Wallace Berry, composer and music theorist
 Hugo Jan Huss, orchestra conductor
 Arthur Kreutz, composer
Robert E. Kreutz, composer
Larry Lelli, musician
Robert Moevs, composer
Robert Schulz, jazz cornetist
Freddie Slack, musician and bandleader

Athletes

American football 

Gordon Bahr, college football coach
George Dahlgren, NFL player
John Fay, NFL player
Kevin Fitzgerald, NFL player
Bob Fitzke, NFL player
Hal Hanson, NFL player and head coach
Parker Hesse, NFL player
Matt Joyce, NFL player
Karl Klug, NFL player
Richard D. Martin, college football coach
Klinks Meyers, APFA player
Tom Newberry, NFL all-pro offensive guard
Jim Temp, NFL player
Clarence Tommerson, NFL player
Bill Vickroy, college football coach
John Wilce, member of the College Football Hall of Fame
Brian Wrobel, NFL player

Baseball 

John Ake, MLB player
Paul Fitzke, MLB and NFL player
Tony Ghelfi, MLB player
Chuck Hockenbery, MLB player
Tom Klawitter, MLB player
Ed Konetchy, MLB player
Damian Miller, MLB player
Ed Servais, college baseball coach
Scott Servais, MLB player
Frank Skaff, MLB player and manager
Dolly Vanderlip, All-American Girls Professional Baseball League player
Jarrod Washburn, MLB Player
George Williams, MLB player

Basketball 

Scott Christopherson, basketball player
Johnny Davis, NBA player, Washington Wizards 
Jordan Davis, Wisconsin Men’s Basketball
Kobe King, College Basketball player
Bronson Koenig, basketball player
Doug Martin, college basketball coach
John Mengelt, NBA player
Glen Selbo, NBA player, selected second overall in 1947 NBA Draft
Philip Saunders, NBA coach

Other 

Orville Buckner, professional boxer
Tim Gullikson, tennis player and coach
Tom Gullikson, tennis player and coach
Barbara Harwerth, Olympic volleyball player
Don Iverson, professional golfer
Ty Loomis, volleyball player
Eddie Murphy, Olympic medalist
Mike Peplinski, curler
George Poage, first African American to win an Olympic medal
Ryan Quinn, curler

Businesspeople 

George Addes, founder of United Auto Workers
Austen Cargill, president of Cargill
William Wallace Cargill, founder of Cargill
Fay Marvin Clark, real estate developer
Russell G. Cleary, president of the G. Heileman Brewing Company
Charles Gelatt, businessman and philanthropist
George Gund II, banker and real estate investor
Gottlieb Heileman, founder of G. Heileman Brewing Company
John H. MacMillan Sr, President of Cargill
Edwin W. Rice, President of General Electric
James Trane, co-founder of Trane
Reuben Trane, co-founder of Trane

Military personnel 

 Stuart P. Baker, U.S. Navy Rear Admiral
 Robert J. Flynn, U.S. Navy Commander
 John Shuman, Army Distinguished Service Medal recipient
 Woodrow Swancutt, U.S. Air Force Major General

Politicians 

 Malvin R. Anderson, Minnesota state legislator and businessman
 Wendell Abraham Anderson, Chairman of the Democratic Party of Wisconsin
 Elmer E. Barlow, Wisconsin Supreme Court justice
 Reginald Bicha
 Timothy Burns, Lieutenant Governor of Wisconsin
 Erasmus D. Campbell, Lieutenant Governor of Wisconsin and Mayor of La Crosse
 Ebenezer Childs, Territorial legislator
 Barbara Flynn Currie, Illinois State Representative
 Charles G. Dawes, Vice President of the United States
 George Gale, Wisconsin circuit court judge
 George A. Garrett, U.S. diplomat
 Wayne J. Hood, Executive Director of the Republican National Committee
 John Azor Kellogg, U.S. military leader and state senator
 Charles E. Knoblauch, Iowa State Representative
 Minnie C. T. Love, Colorado State Representative and member of the Women of the Ku Klux Klan
 Patrick Joseph Lucey, Governor of Wisconsin, U.S. diplomat
 Paul Lundsten, Wisconsin court of appeals judge
 Paul Marcotte, businessman and Kentucky State Representative
 Thomas Morris, Lieutenant Governor of Wisconsin
 Gary K. Nelson, Attorney General of Arizona
 Mike O'Callaghan, Governor of Nevada
 Jim Omerberg, member of the West Virginia House of Delegates
 Theodore D. Parsons, New Jersey Attorney General
 George Wilbur Peck, newspaper publisher, humorist, mayor of Milwaukee, and Governor of Wisconsin
 John Rusche, Idaho State Representative
 Jane Magnus-Stinson, federal judge
 Ellis Baker Usher, Chairman of the Democratic Party of Wisconsin
 Julia Wallace, New Zealand politician
 Cadwallader C. Washburn, Civil War General, Wisconsin Governor, and U.S. Representative
 James M. Wahl, Member of the Dakota Territorial Legislature.
 Michael A. Wolff, Chief Justice of the Supreme Court of Missouri

United States legislators 

 Charles S. Benton, U.S. Representative from New York
 Fred Biermann, U.S. Representative from Iowa
 Angus Cameron, U.S. Senator
 Frank P. Coburn, U.S. Representative
 John J. Esch, U.S. Representative
 Merlin Hull, U.S. Representative
 Ron Kind, U.S. Representative
 James T. McCleary, U.S. Representative from Minnesota
 Augustus Herman Pettibone, U.S. Representative from Tennessee
 William H. Stevenson, U.S. Representative
 Clark W. Thompson, U.S. Representative from Texas
 Gardner R. Withrow, U.S. Representative
 Gilbert Motier Woodward, U.S. Representative

Wisconsin state legislators 

 Raymond Bice, Sr., businessman, State Representative and senator
 Jill Billings, State Representative
 Otto Bosshard, State Representative
 John Brindley, State Representative and La Crosse County judge
 Sylvester G. Clements, State Representative and businessman
 Elijah Fox Cook, Michigan and Wisconsin State Senator
 James Devitt, State Representative and Senator
 Steve Doyle, State Representative
 John S. Durland, State Representative
 Thomas A. Dyson, State Senator and county judge
 Edwin Flint, State Senator and circuit court judge
 Lawrence R. Gibson, State Representative
 Levi Withee Gibson, State Representative
 Gerald Greider, State Representative
 Thomas Harnisch, State Senator
 Gideon Hixon, Wisconsin State Representative and senator
 James J. Hogan, Wisconsin State Representative and Mayor of La Crosse
 Clark L. Hood, State Representative
 William Hull, State Representative
 Thomas Johnson, State Representative
 Dan Kapanke, State Senator
 Milo Knutson, mayor of La Crosse and state senator
 Edward C. Krause, State Representative
 Carl Kurtenecker, State Representative
 Donald A. McDonald, State Representative
 John Medinger, Mayor of La Crosse and State Representative
 Isaac E. Messmore, State Representative and Civil War Colonel
 Mark Meyer, State Representative and Senator
 Lewis T. Mittness, State Representative
 John Mulder, State Representative
 Leland E. Mulder, State Representative
 Henry Nein, State Representative
 Lee Nerison, State Representative
 John Oestreicher, State Representative
 Paul Offner, State Representative and Senator
 Oscar S. Paulson, State Senator
 James D. H. Peterson, State Representative
 Brad Pfaff, State Senator
 George H. Ray, State Representative
 Arnt O. Rhea, State Representative
 Theodore Rodolf, State Representative
 Rudolph Schlabach, State Representative and Senator
 Marlin Schneider, State Representative
 Jennifer Shilling, State Senator
 Albert O. Sorge, State Representative
 Gysbert Van Steenwyk, Sr., Mayor of La Crosse, State Representative and Senator
 Thomas Benton Stoddard, first mayor of La Crosse and State Representative
 Gregg Underheim, State Representative
 D. Russell Wartinbee, State Representative
 Guilford M. Wiley, State Representative
 Merrick Wing, State Senator
 Levi Withee, State Senator
 Niram Withee, State Representative

Religious leaders 

Patrick Augustine, Anglican assistant bishop
Thea Bowman, Roman Catholic religious sister and educator
Raymond Burke, Cardinal Prefect of the Vatican's Supreme Tribunal of the Apostolic Signatura
William P. Callahan, Roman Catholic bishop
Kilian Caspar Flasch, Roman Catholic bishop
Frederick William Freking, Roman Catholic bishop
William Richard Griffin, Roman Catholic bishop
Michael Heiss, first Roman Catholic bishop of the Diocese of La Crosse
Alexander Joseph McGavick, Roman Catholic bishop
John Joseph Paul, Roman Catholic bishop
James Schwebach, Roman Catholic bishop
John Patrick Treacy, Roman Catholic bishop

Others 

Ed Gein, serial killer and grave robber
Evelyn Hartley, teenager missing since 1953
Ken Kratz
Scott Thorson

See also 

La Crosse, Wisconsin
List of people from Wisconsin

References 

La Crosse
La Crosse